The 2011–12 Houston Cougars men's basketball team represented the University of Houston in the college basketball 2011–12 season. It was their 67th year of season play.  The head coach for the Cougars was James Dickey, who was serving in his 2nd year in that position.  The team played its home games at Hofheinz Pavilion on-campus in Houston and was a member of Conference USA. The Cougars improved from the season prior by ending the season with a 0.500 record at 15–15, but only managed 7–9 in conference play. In a season marked by inconsistent play, the team ended their season with an overtime loss to UTEP in the Conference USA tournament.

Roster

Schedule

|-
!colspan=9| Exhibition

|-
!colspan=9| Regular season

|-
!colspan=9| 2012 Conference USA men's basketball tournament

References

Houston
Houston Cougars men's basketball seasons
Houston
Houston